Dana Elise Glauberman is an American film editor.

Early life and education 
Glauberman was born in Los Angeles County, California.  As a child, she enjoyed jigsaw puzzles.  She attended the University of California, Santa Barbara originally interested in photography, but took a film production class which introduced her to film editing, a career she considers very similar to her childhood jigsaw puzzles.  She graduated with a B.A. in film studies in December 1990.

Career 
Glauberman's first industry job was as a production assistant with Hearst Entertainment.  She worked under Arthur Schmidt, Sheldon Kahn, and Wendy Greene-Bricmont, while gaining experience.  She worked primarily in television throughout the 1990s, editing for Northern Exposure, Dr. Quinn, Medicine Woman and Love Boat: The Next Wave.

While assisting Sheldon Kahn with film projects by Ivan Reitman, Glauberman was in the right place at the right time and became acquainted with Jason Reitman, Ivan's son.  Jason Reitman subsequently asked her to edit his first feature film, Thank You for Smoking, after Glauberman had helped him previously.  Thank You for Smoking''' was very well received, and Glauberman's editing was nominated for an American Cinema Editors Eddie Award.  She was nominated for this award again through her work on Reitman's next film, Juno.

Glauberman's third feature with Reitman, Up in the Air, marked the first time she worked with high-definition.  She received her third Eddie nomination for her work on the film.

 Honors and awards 
In addition to her Eddie Award nominations, Glauberman has won two awards: the 2009 Hamilton Behind the Camera Awards' Editor of the Year for Up in the Air and the 2009 Hollywood Film Festival's Hollywood Editor Award.
Glauberman was voted in as a member of the American Cinema Editors.

 Personal life 
Glauberman resides in Los Angeles, California.

 Filmography as editor 
The director of each film is indicated in parentheses. The filmography is based on the Internet Movie Database.
 Ghostbusters: Afterlife (J. Reitman-2021)
 Creed II (Steven Caple Jr.-2018)
 Men, Women & Children (J. Reitman-2014)
 Draft Day (I. Reitman-2014)
 Labor Day (J. Reitman-2013)
 The Guilt Trip (Fletcher-2012)
 No Strings Attached (I. Reitman-2011)
 Young Adult (J. Reitman - 2011)
 Love Happens (Camp-2009)
 Up in the Air (J. Reitman-2009)
 Juno (J. Reitman-2007)
 Factory Girl (Hickenlooper-2006)
 Thank You for Smoking (J. Reitman-2005)
 Heart of the Beholder (Tipton-2005)
 Rain (Wilson-2001)
 A Song for Jade (Himes-2001)
 E.T. the Extra-Terrestrial'' (20th Anniversary live showing)

See also
List of film director and editor collaborations

References

External links 
 

1968 births
Living people
University of California, Santa Barbara alumni
American film editors
American Cinema Editors